The MacTavish Cup is a knock-out cup competition in the sport of shinty.  It is competed for by senior teams from the North of Scotland district. It is one of the five trophies considered to be part of the Grand Slam in the sport of shinty. The current holders are Newtonmore. The competition is currently sponsored by cottages.com.

The final is habitually played at the Bught Park, Inverness.

History
The trophy is a rose bowl presented by Duncan MacTavish of Stratherrick in 1898 and the first competition was played that year and was won by Skye Camanachd.

The final was televised for the first time in 2009 by BBC Alba.  The 2009 winners were Newtonmore Camanachd, managed by Norman MacArthur.

As of 2010, the opening rounds of the cup were to be played midweek, in order to reduce the backlog of fixtures that has regularly afflicted shinty.  This caused major controversy and Skye Camanachd sent an official letter of complaint to the Camanachd Association.  However, this decision was reversed and midweek fixtures were reserved for junior level cups.

The 2010 final was played between Kingussie and Kilmallie, who upset Fort William to reach the final. The game was a magnificent advert for shinty and was won 5-4 by Kingussie. It was broadcast live on BBC 2 Scotland.

In 2014, the MacTavish Plate was established for teams losing in the first round. Fort William triumphed 2-1 over Skye Camanachd in the first final at Craigard, Invergarry.

Only 5 clubs have managed to retain the trophy. Newtonmore being the most recent in 2016 and 2017, however Kingussie and Newtonmore have both done it multiple times both dominating for long periods. Fort Augustus and Inverness have both also successfully defended the trophy both doing so before The Great War.

Glenurquhart won the cup in 2015, defeating Newtonmore. This was notable not only for being their first victory in the competition but having lost the previous two finals to Lovat, as well as the 2008 final to Kingussie.

The 2018 final saw Newtonmore comeback from a goal down to defeat 2017 Premiership League champions Kinlochshiel 2-1 in a closely fought encounter at the Bught Park, Inverness. The match was shown live on BBC Alba.

List of Winners
2022 Kingussie 5, Caberfeidh 2
2021 Kinlochshiel 3, Kingussie 2
2019 Newtonmore 3, Glenurquhart 0
2018 Newtonmore 2, Kinlochsheil 1
2017 Newtonmore 3, Kilmallie 2
2016 Newtonmore 2, Lochaber 1
2015 Glenurquhart 3, Newtonmore 1
2014 Lovat 5, Glenurquhart 1
2013 Lovat 1, Glenurquhart 1 (a.e.t.) Lovat won 3-1 on penalties. 
2012 Newtonmore 5, Lochaber 1
2011 Kingussie 2, Fort William 1
2010 Kingussie 5, Kilmallie 4 (a.e.t.)
2009 Newtonmore 5, Kingussie 4
2008 Kingussie 6, Glenurquhart 1
2007 Fort William 1, Kingussie 0
2006 Kingussie 5, Fort William 2 (a.e.t.)
2005 Kingussie 6, Newtonmore 1
2004 Kingussie
2003 Kingussie
2002 Newtonmore
2001 Kingussie
2000 Fort William
1999 Kingussie
1998 Kingussie
1997 Kingussie
1996 Fort William
1995 Kingussie
1994 Kingussie
1993 Kingussie
1992 Kingussie
1991 Kingussie
1990 Kingussie
1989 Kingussie
1988 Kingussie
1987 Newtonmore
1986 Newtonmore
1985 Newtonmore
1984 Kingussie
1983 Newtonmore
1982 Kingussie
1981 Kingussie
1980 Newtonmore
1979 Newtonmore
1978 Newtonmore
1977 Newtonmore
1976 Newtonmore
1975 Newtonmore
1974 Newtonmore
1973 Newtonmore
1972 Newtonmore
1971 Newtonmore
1970 Newtonmore
1969 Kilmallie
1968 Newtonmore
1967 Kilmallie
1966 Newtonmore
1965 Kingussie
1964 Newtonmore
1963 Newtonmore
1962 Kingussie
1961 Kilmallie
1960 Newtonmore
1959 Kilmallie
1958 Newtonmore
1957 Kingussie
1956 Newtonmore
1955 Newtonmore
1954 Newtonmore
1953 Lovat
1952 Ballachulish
1951 Newtonmore
1950 Newtonmore
1949 Lovat
1948 Ballachulish
1947 Lovat
1939 Newtonmore
1938 Ballachulish
1937 Caberfeidh
1936 Newtonmore
1935 Caberfeidh
1934 Caberfeidh
1933 Spean Bridge
1932 Caberfeidh
1931 Newtonmore
1930 Newtonmore
1929 Newtonmore
1928 Lovat
1927 Newtonmore
1926 Lovat
1925 Spean Bridge
1924 Newtonmore
1923 Newtonmore
1922 Spean Bridge
1921 Kingussie
1920 Newtonmore
1914 Kingussie
1913 Beauly
1912 Inverness
1911 Inverness
1910 Fort Augustus
1909 Fort Augustus
1908 Wester Ross
1907 Inverness
1906 Lovat
1905 Beauly
1904 No Competition
1903 No Competition
1902 Newtonmore
1901 Kingussie
1900 Laggan
1899 Beauly
1898 Skye Camanachd

Table of Winners

References

External links
Report on 2007 Final
2009 competition

1898 in sports
1898 in Scottish sport
Sports trophies and awards
Shinty competitions